Argüébanes is a town in the municipality of Camaleño (Cantabria, Spain).

References
 
 La Liébana. Picos de Europa. Guía turística editada y realizada por Edición y diseño y la colaboración de J. R. Gutiérrez Aja. Santander, 1996. 
 Madoz, Pascual, Diccionario geográfico-estadístico-histórico de España y sus posesiones de Ultramar. Madrid, 1845–1850. Edición facsímil por Ámbito Ediciones, S.A. y Librería Estudio. Valladolid, 1984.

Municipalities of Spain